Kaiserliche Werft Kiel ("Imperial shipyard Kiel") was a German shipbuilding company  founded in 1867, first as Königliche Werft Kiel but renamed in 1871, with the proclamation of the German Empire. Together with Kaiserliche Werft Danzig and Kaiserliche Werft Wilhelmshaven it was one of three shipyards which produced warships for the Preußische Marine and later the Kaiserliche Marine. With the end of World War I Kaiserliche Werft Kiel was closed but the shipyard was opened again when Deutsche Werke was founded on their grounds in 1925 (active until 1945, and re-activated as shipyard by Howaldtswerke-Deutsche Werft in 1955).

Warships built
Coastal defense ship  (1892)
Coastal defense ship  (1893)
Coastal defense ship  (1895)
Armored cruiser  (1900)
Armored cruiser  (1901)
Armored cruiser  (1903)
Armored cruiser  (1908)
Light cruiser  (1909)
 Kaiser-class battleship  (1911)
Light cruiser  (1913)
Light cruiser  (1915)

U-Boats

Aircraft
Kaiserliche Werft Kiel 463

Shipbuilding companies of Germany
Companies established in 1867
Companies of Prussia
Defunct companies of Germany
Companies based in Kiel